Paul Franklin "Bill" Otis (December 24, 1889 – December 15, 1990) was a Major League Baseball player. Otis played for the New York Highlanders in the  season. He was born in Scituate, Massachusetts, and died in Duluth, Minnesota. At the time of his death, he was the oldest living former major league player.

See also
List of centenarians (Major League Baseball players)
List of centenarians (sportspeople)

References

External links

1889 births
1990 deaths
American centenarians
Men centenarians
Baseball players from Massachusetts
New York Highlanders players
Williams Ephs baseball players
People from Scituate, Massachusetts
Sportspeople from Plymouth County, Massachusetts